Eunos Group Representation Constituency (Simplified Chinese: 友诺士集选区;Traditional Chinese: 友諾士集選區) is a defunct Group Representation Constituency (GRC) in the north-eastern region of Singapore. This GRC existed for the 1988 and 1991 general election before being absorbed into Aljunied GRC and the brand new East Coast GRC for the 1997 general election.

Eunos GRC was won narrowly by the People's Action Party in both the 1988 and 1991 General Elections. Eunos GRC was formerly led by Zulkifli bin Mohammed in 1988 and Sidek bin Saniff in 1991.

One of the MPs, Tay Eng Soon died of a heart failure in 1993. No by-election was called to fill in the vacant seat.

After the 1991 election, Eunos GRC was redrawn into several different constituencies, owing to further developments in both Pasir Ris and Tampines which were both ready in the process. Therefore, it necessitated the redrawing. Kaki Bukit became one of the founding constituencies for the brand new East Coast GRC while Tampines North and Pasir Ris became the founding constituencies for the brand new Pasir Ris GRC due to further developments within Pasir Ris New Town and Neighbourhood 4 of Tampines. Most parts of Tampines New Town were given to Tampines GRC, with the constituency now known as Tampines Central. Eunos on the other hand, shifted to Aljunied GRC, making it five seats.

Members of Parliament

Tay died on 5 August 1993 due to heart failure.

Candidates and results

Elections in 1980s

Elections in 1990s

References

1988 General Election's Result in Eunos GRC
1991 General Election's Result in Eunos GRC
Background history of Eunos GRC in 1988 GE

Singaporean electoral divisions